Chevy Chase Section Three is a village in Montgomery County, Maryland. It was organized as a Special Tax District in 1916 and incorporated as a village in 1982. The population was 760 at the 2010 census.

It is part of a larger community, colloquially referred to as Chevy Chase, that includes several adjoining settlements in Montgomery County and one neighborhood of Washington, D.C.

Geography
Chevy Chase Section Three is located at  (38.979043, -77.072948).

There are 280 residential lots in Section 3, and the village also contains the Chevy Chase United Methodist Church.

Demographics

2010 census
As of the census of 2010, 760 people resided in the village. The racial makeup of the village was 92.1% White, 1.3% African American, 0.1% Native American, 2.6% Asian, 0.7% from other races, and 3.2% from two or more races. Hispanic or Latino of any race were 3.9% of the population.

There were 271 households, of which 41.3% had children under the age of 18 living with them, 73.4% were married couples living together, 7.7% had a female householder with no husband present, 1.1% had a male householder with no wife present, and 17.7% were non-families. The average household size was 2.80; but 15.5% consisted of one person, and 9.5% of one person 65 years of age or older.

The population included 223 families whose average size was 3.11.

The median age in the village was 43.8 years. 28.7% of residents were under the age of 18; 4.1% were between the ages of 18 and 24; 18.7% were from 25 to 44; 28.2% were from 45 to 64; and 20.3% were 65 years of age or older. The gender makeup of the village was 47.0% male and 53.0% female.

2000 census
At the 2000 census, the median household income was $150,000, and the median family income was $162,659. Males had a median income of $100,000 versus $60,313 for females. The per capita income for the village was $76,392. About 0.9% of families and 1.3% of the population were below the poverty line, including none of those under the age of eighteen or sixty-five or over.

Law and government
Chevy Chase Section Three has a five-member village council elected by the residents. The village also falls under the jurisdiction of the Montgomery County Council.

Education
Residents are served by the Montgomery County Public Schools.  Residents are zoned to Rosemary Hills Elementary School (PreK-2) Chevy Chase Elementary School (3-6),  Silver Creek Middle School and Bethesda-Chevy Chase High School.

Transportation

The only state highway serving Chevy Chase Section Three directly is Maryland Route 186 (Brookville Road), which traverses the east edge of the village from south to north. Maryland Route 185 (Connecticut Avenue) passes just west of the village corporate limits in a similar orientation.

References

External links

 

1916 establishments in Maryland
1982 establishments in Maryland
Chevy Chase, Maryland
Populated places established in 1916
Populated places established in 1982
Suburbs of Washington, D.C.
Upper class culture in Maryland
Villages in Montgomery County, Maryland